Lo King-man (born 1937) is a Hong Kong performing artist and director. He is dubbed as the "Father of Hong Kong Opera". He is also the former vice-chairman of the Urban Council from 1990 to 1995, as well as member of the various public advisory boards including the member of the Hong Kong Basic Law Consultative Committee from 1985 to 1990.

Early life and education
Lo was born in Hong Kong and was educated at the Diocesan Boys' School. He was graduated from the University of Hong Kong (HKU) with a Bachelor of Arts degree in English. During his studies, he received scholarship from the Italian government to study theatre history and literature at the Sapienza University of Rome. During his stay in Italy, he interned at the Teatro dell'Opera di Roma and the Teatro Politeama.

Career
He worked at the University of Hong Kong where he promoted to the senior deputy dean of studies. In 1973, he joined the newly established Hong Kong Polytechnic as the founding dean of studies and later deputy dean. In 1993, he was appointed Director of the Hong Kong Academy for Performing Arts until he retired in 2004. Under his directorship, he formed the bachelor programme and Film & TV, Humanities, Language Studies and Chinese Opera Studies. From 2004 to 2009, he was appointed principal of the Guangdong International Music Summer Camp by the Guangdong government.

He was first appointed to the Committee of Inquiry into the Precious Blood Golden Jubilee Secondary School in 1978 headed by Dr. Rayson Huang amidst the Golden Jubilee Secondary School scandal. In 1984, he was appointed member of the Urban Council and was the vice-chairman of the Urban Council from 1990 to 1995. He formed the Hong Kong People's Association with Ronald Leung, Wong Siu-lun, Margaret Ng and Elsie Leung, one of the earliest pressure groups in the transition period in 1984. He was also a member of the Hong Kong Basic Law Consultative Committee from 1985 to 1990. He was also member of the Kowloon City District Board, councils of the four universities including the University of Hong Kong, Hong Kong Examinations Authority, Hong Kong Broadcasting Authority, Vocational Training Council, Advisory Committee on Community Relations of the Independent Commission Against Corruption, Standing Commission on Civil Service Salaries and Conditions of Service, Hong Kong Arts Development Council and other advisory boards. Lo was also one of the founders of the Hong Kong Arts Centre. He was also involved in the Hong Kong Philharmonic Orchestra and Hong Kong Sinfonietta. He was also member of the Hong Kong Cultural Centre.

Lo wrote, directed and produced more than 180 Western opera, theatre and musicals. He was the member of the international advisory committee of the Beijing Music Festival and the guest professor of the Central Conservatory of Music. He was awarded with the "Best Stage Design" by the Hong Kong Federation of Drama Societies, the "Best Stage Director" by the Hong Kong Artists' Guild, "Lifetime Achievement Award" by the International Society for the Performing Arts and "Award for Outstanding Contribution in Arts" by the Hong Kong Arts Development Council.

Awards and recognition
He was awarded Justice of the Peace, Order of the British Empire by the United Kingdom, Order of Merit of the Italian Republic by the Italian Republic and Ordre des Arts et des Lettres by the French Minister of Culture. He also received honorary fellowships from the University of Hong Kong, the Hong Kong Polytechnic University and the Hong Kong Academy for Performing Arts and the Royal Academy of Arts. He received the Bronze Bauhinia Star (BBS) and the Silver Bauhinia Star (SBS) by the Hong Kong SAR government in 2005 and 2012.

Organized by the Hong Kong Arts Development Council (HKADC), the 15th Hong Kong Arts Development Awards was held on Oct 30, 2021.  Lo was the recipient of The Life Achievement Award, having dedicated himself to the arts sector for more than half a century, participating in countless stage performances in various roles including actor, playwright, producer, director and stage designer. Lo is also a pioneer in the local arts and cultural scene and has been the first Chinese to produce opera in Hong Kong.

References

1937 births
Living people
District councillors of Kowloon City District
Members of the Urban Council of Hong Kong
Hong Kong Basic Law Consultative Committee members
Hong Kong male stage actors
Hong Kong dramatists and playwrights
People educated at Diocesan Boys' School
Alumni of the University of Hong Kong
Academic staff of the University of Hong Kong
Academic staff of Hong Kong Polytechnic University
Members of the Order of the British Empire
Recipients of the Order of Merit of the Italian Republic
Recipients of the Ordre des Arts et des Lettres
Recipients of the Bronze Bauhinia Star
Recipients of the Silver Bauhinia Star